Nikola Zivotic (born 26 January 1996) is an Austrian footballer who plays as a left winger for SV Lafnitz.

External links
 

Austrian footballers
Austrian Football Bundesliga players
SC Rheindorf Altach players
1996 births
Living people
Association football midfielders
Austrian people of Serbian descent
SC Wiener Neustadt players